The 48th International Antalya Golden Orange Film Festival was a film festival held in Antalya, Turkey from October 8 to 14, 2011. Films were shown with the theme "...And the Woman Touched the World" focusing on women and the violence that women  face in their daily lives.  The Golden Orange selection committees, including the International and National Competition Juries, were entirely composed of female members for the first time in the festival's history.

This edition of the International Antalya Golden Orange Film Festival was the third to be organised solely by the Antalya Foundation for Culture and Arts (AKSAV), a cultural body affiliated with the Antalya Greater Municipality. The festival opened with a ceremony at the Cam Piramit Congress and Exhibition Center on October 7, 2011 at which the honorary awards were presented, songs were sung by Jane Birkin and Zuhal Olcay, and Azerbaijani director Rustam Ibragimbekov was guest of honour.

Competitions were also run for the cancelled 16th (1979) and 17th (1980) editions of the festival with Belated Golden Oranges being presented to the winners.

Awards

National Feature Film Competition Awards

Best Film: Good Days to Come directed by Hasan Tolga Pulat
Best First Film: Zenne Dancer directed by M. Caner Alper & Mehmet Binay
Best Director: Cigdem Vitrinel for What Remains
Best Script: Emre Kavuk for Good Days to Come
Best Cinematographer: Kenan Korkmaz for The Luxury Hotel and Norayr Casper for Zenne Dancer
Best Music: Frank Schreiber & Hemin Derya for The Walk
Best Actress: Devin Ozgur Cinar for What Remains
Best Actor: Erdal Besikcioglu for Behzat Ç. I Buried You in My Heart
Best Supporting Actress: Tilbe Saran for Zenne Dancer & Nesrin Cavadzade for Good Days to Come
Best Supporting Actor: Erkan Avcı for Zenne Dancer
Best Editor: Kalendar Hasan for Good Days to Come
Best Art Director: Giyasettin Sehir for The Walk

Competition Sections

National Feature Film Competition 
Thirteen Turkish films made in the preceding year were selected by the Pre-Evaluation Board from the 45 eligible to compete in the festival’s National Feature Film Competition.

National Feature Film Competition Jury 
Jury Head: Müjde Ar (Turkish actress)
Handan İpekçi (Turkish director)
Vahide Gördüm (Turkish actress - unable to attend due to health reasons)
Bergüzar Korel (Turkish actress)
Ayşe Kulin (Turkish author)
Yasar Seyman (Turkish author)
Annie Geelmuyden Pertan (artistic director)
Şevval Sam (Turkish musician and actress)
Melis Behlil (Turkish film critic / academic)
Serpil Kırel (Turkish academic)
Çiğdem Anad (Turkish journalist)

National Feature Film Competition Selection 
Behzat Ç. I Buried You in My Heart directed by Serdar Akar
Can directed by Raşit Çelikezer
The Monsters' Dinner directed by Ramin Matin
Altruist directed by Hüseyin Eleman
What Remains directed by Çiğdem Vitrinel
Good Days to Come directed by Hasan Tolga Pulat
Which Movie? directed by Egemen Sancak
Hicaz directed by Erdal Rahmi Hanay
The Luxury Hotel directed by Kenan Korkmaz
Pomegranate directed by Ümit Ünal
Requiem for Foresight directed by Savaş Baykal
The Walk directed by Shiar Abdi
Zenne Dancer directed by M. Caner Alper & Mehmet Binay

See also 
 Turkish films of 2011
 2011 in film

External links
  for the festival

References

Antalya Golden Orange Film Festival
Antalya Golden Orange
Antalya Golden Orange Film Festival
21st century in Antalya